Omdahl is a Norwegian surname, given to people from several farms in Agder and Rogaland.

Notable people 
Notable people with this surname include:

 David Omdahl (born 1956), American politician
 Harmon T. Ogdahl (1917–2009), American politician and businessman
 Jan Omdahl (born 1961), Norwegian journalist
 Lloyd Omdahl (born 1931), American politician
 Vicki Jo Omdahl, later known as Brynn Hartman (1958–1998), wife and murderer of Phil Hartman

References